Rudd is a city in Floyd County, Iowa, United States. The population was 358 at the time of the 2020 census, a decline of 16.9% from 431 in 2000.

Geography
Rudd is located at  (43.128528, -92.903713).

Demographics

2010 census
As of the census of 2010, there were 369 people, 175 households, and 103 families living in the city. The racial makeup of the city was 95.9% White, 0.5% Native American, 0.8% from other races, and 2.7% from two or more races. Hispanic or Latino of any race were 4.9% of the population.

There were 175 households, of which 25.1% had children under the age of 18 living with them, 45.1% were married couples living together, 7.4% had a female householder with no husband present, 6.3% had a male householder with no wife present, and 41.1% were non-families. 35.4% of all households were made up of individuals, and 10.9% had someone living alone who was 65 years of age or older. The average household size was 2.11 and the average family size was 2.71.

The median age in the city was 45.2 years. 21.1% of residents were under the age of 18; 6.5% were between the ages of 18 and 24; 22.3% were from 25 to 44; 30.3% were from 45 to 64; and 19.8% were 65 years of age or older. The gender makeup of the city was 50.7% male and 49.3% female.

2000 census
As of the census of 2000, there were 431 people, 182 households, and 123 families living in the city. The racial makeup of the city was 99.07% White, and 0.93% from two or more races. Hispanic or Latino of any race were 1.39% of the population.

There were 182 households, out of which 31.3% had children under the age of 18 living with them, 58.2% were married couples living together, 6.0% had a female householder with no husband present, and 32.4% were non-families. 28.0% of all households were made up of individuals, and 13.7% had someone living alone who was 65 years of age or older. The average household size was 2.37 and the average family size was 2.91.

In the city, the population was spread out, with 26.2% under the age of 18, 7.0% from 18 to 24, 24.8% from 25 to 44, 24.6% from 45 to 64, and 17.4% who were 65 years of age or older. The median age was 40 years. For every 100 females, there were 90.7 males. For every 100 females age 18 and over, there were 95.1 males.

The median income for a household in the city was $32,679, and the median income for a family was $43,750. Males had a median income of $29,750 versus $20,625 for females. The per capita income for the city was $17,167. About 4.6% of families and 7.7% of the population were below the poverty line, including 9.2% of those under age 18 and 7.5% of those age 65 or over.

Education
The Rudd-Rockford-Marble Rock Community School District operates area public schools.

References

External links

 
City-Data Comprehensive statistical data and more about Rudd

Cities in Floyd County, Iowa
Cities in Iowa